Charles Henry Hardisty (10 December 1885 – 2 March 1968) was an English first-class cricketer, who played thirty eight matches for Yorkshire County Cricket Club between 1906 and 1909, and a first-class match for J Bamford's XI in 1908. He also appeared for the Yorkshire Second XI from 1906 to 1910, H Hayley's XI in 1906 and Northumberland in 1911.

Born in Horsforth, Leeds, Yorkshire, England, Hardisty was a right-handed batsman, who scored 998 runs at 19.19, with a best of 84 against Leicestershire. He also scored 74 against the Australian tourists. He made five fifties in all, and took 20 catches.

He joined Horsforth Hall Park when a boy and played for Leeds from 1906 to 1910. In 1911, he joined the Northumberland club, Jesmond C.C., and spent over 12 years in the North-East, including spells at Consett, Wallsend and Ryton-on-Tyne. He was the professional at Wallsend C.C. in 1921, and  returned to Yorkshire to captain Horsforth C.C., also assisting Leeds and Keighley.

Hardisty died in March 1968 in Leeds.

References

Sources
Cricinfo Profile
Cricket Archive Statistics

1885 births
1968 deaths
Yorkshire cricketers
People from Horsforth
English cricketers of 1890 to 1918
Sportspeople from Yorkshire